The Rosario-class gunboats were a class of two pre-World War I warships, designed and built in England in 1907–1909 as armoured riverine gunboats, to patrol the rivers Paraná and Uruguay. They were in service with the Argentine Navy from the late 1900s to the early 1950s. The lead ship of the class was named after Rosario, one of the major cities in Argentina.

Design 

Argentina decided the construction of new warships due to the deterioration of relations with Brazil, who was after the naval supremacy in South America. The Brazilian Navy ordered riverine monitors to patrol the border rivers; Argentina's response was to place a contract with the British shipyard Armstrong, Mitchell & Co for the construction of two riverine gunboats.

The Rosario class gunboats had a shallow-draft metal hull with a single mast and funnel on the superstructure amidships. They were powered by two Vickers triple-expansion steam engines fed by two Yarrow boilers, driving two propellers.

Its main battery was composed of two  howitzers and six  guns. The secondary battery was composed of two 37 mm Nordenfelt autocannons and 4 to 8  machine guns. It also carried two  naval landing guns with wheeled carriage.

Service history 

The Rosario class was designed in the mid 1900s and the ships were laid down in 1907 and completed in 1908–1909. They were commissioned by the Argentine Navy in 1908–1909 and remained in service until the early 1950s.

Rosario and Paraná were frequently used to patrol the rivers Paraná and Uruguay; and were deployed to Asunción during the 1911 revolution in Paraguay. They were also used in training exercises, and occasionally deployed to Patagonia.

Both ships were sold for scrap after being decommissioned, and were broken up in the 1960s.

Specifications

Ships in class

Footnotes

See also 
 List of ships of the Argentine Navy
 Javary-class monitor – riverine monitor ordered but never commissioned by Brazil

References

Notes

Bibliography

Further reading

External links 

 
Gunboats of Argentina
Ships built by Armstrong Whitworth